The Perth Entertainment Centre was an indoor arena and cinema complex in Perth, Western Australia, located on Wellington Street at the northern edge of the Perth central business district. It was demolished as part of the Perth City Link project in late 2011, with its replacement, Perth Arena, opening the following year.

History
The venue was conceived and championed by the late Brian Treasure, then General Manager at Perth television station TVW 7 and theatrical entrepreneur Michael Edgley. Their interest was principally that their two organisations had mounted large stage shows which toured the country in circus tents; a process that created major logistical challenges. The venue was designed by architects Hobbs, Winning and Leighton and was forecast to cost $5 million, but its construction coincided with a period of intense industrial action. Delays and interruptions, including strike action which was timed to coincide with concrete pours, led to a cost blow-out. The final cost was $8.3 million and interest charges put immediate financial pressure on the venture.

In around 1975 the owners approached the State and Federal governments for assistance and the Government of Western Australia took ownership of the building, renaming it The Perth Entertainment Centre.

With a capacity of 8003 seats, the Entertainment Centre was Perth's primary large concert venue from 1974 until its closure in 2002. It was listed in the Guinness Book of World Records as the largest purpose built regular theatre (containing a proscenium arch) in the world. The venue also played host to a number of theatrical extravaganzas, as well as a range of other events including musicals, circuses, corporate functions and international beauty pageants (Miss Universe 1979).

The Entertainment Centre was home to NBL team Perth Wildcats from 1990 until 2002. It was also home to the Perth Breakers of the WNBL from 1988 to 1989.

At the front of the Perth Entertainment Centre (west side) was "The Academy Twin Cinemas" which opened on 17 January 1975.  The name changed to "Academy West End Alternative Cinemas" in June 1986. The name changed again to "Lumiere Cinema" in 1989. The "Lumiere Cinema" closed on 28 June 1996. The theatre remained empty, and was demolished along with the Perth Entertainment Centre.

Concerts

Demolition
The venue was owned by the Seven Network and was officially closed in August 2002. In 2005, the Government of Western Australia unveiled plans for a new entertainment centre to be built on the site of the carpark for the existing centre. In 2006, the new centre was officially given the name of Perth Arena. Demolition of the disused venue began on 11 May 2011 and was completed in December 2011, in preparation for the State Government's Perth City Link project and included tentative approvals for new residential and business towers on the site.

References

External links

6000TIMES : photo series inside Perth Entertainment Centre prior to demolition
Northbridge Link
NorthbridgeLink.com
Brian Treasure

Defunct indoor arenas in Australia
Sports venues in Perth, Western Australia
Defunct National Basketball League (Australia) venues
Defunct basketball venues in Australia
Former music venues in Australia
Seven Network
Perth Wildcats
1974 establishments in Australia
Defunct tourist attractions in Australia
Wellington Street, Perth
Former buildings and structures in Perth, Western Australia
2011 disestablishments in Australia
Sports venues completed in 1974
Sports venues demolished in 2011
Demolished buildings and structures in Western Australia